John Smyth may refer to:

John Smyth (English theologian) (1554–1612), considered the earliest Baptist
John Smyth (barrister) (1941–2018), British QC
John Smyth (footballer) (born 1970), Irish former professional footballer
John Smyth (Master of Pembroke) (1744–1809), clergyman and Master of Pembroke College, Oxford
John Smyth (minister) (1796–1860), Scottish minister in the Free Church of Scotland 
John Smyth (priest) (died 1704), Anglican archdeacon in Ireland
John Smyth (sculptor) (c. 1773–1840), Irish sculptor
John Smyth (snooker referee) (1928–2007)
John Smyth (1748–1811), British member of parliament for Pontefract
John George Smyth (1815–1869), Conservative member of parliament for the City of York
John Henry Greville Smyth, English naturalist and collector
John Henry Smyth, British member of parliament for Cambridge University
John Paterson Smyth (1852–1932), Canadian Anglican priest, Archdeacon of Montreal
John Rowland Smyth (1803–1873), British soldier
Sir John Smyth, 1st Baronet (1893–1983), British MP, Privy Counsellor in 1962, recipient of the Victoria Cross during the First World War
John Ferdinand Smyth Stuart (1745–1814), until 1793 John Ferdinand Smyth, Scottish physician, soldier, and author

See also
John Smythe (disambiguation)
John Smith (disambiguation)